Donovan Pedelty (1903–1989) was a British journalist, screenwriter and film director.

During the 1930s, Pedelty specialised in making quota quickies with Irish themes. These were generally not well received by critics.

Filmography

Director
 School for Stars (1935)
 Flame in the Heather (1935)
 School for Stars (1935)
 The Luck of the Irish (1936)
 The Early Bird (1936)
 Irish and Proud of It (1936)
 Behind Your Back (1937)
 First Night (1937)
 Landslide (1937)
 False Evidence (1937)
 Bedtime Story (1938)
 Murder Tomorrow (1938)

Screenwriter
 The Little Damozel (1933)
 That's a Good Girl (1933)
 Seeing Is Believing (1934)
 City of Beautiful Nonsense (1935)
 Brewster's Millions (1935)
 Radio Pirates (1935)
 Two on a Doorstep (1936)

References

Bibliography
 Chibnall, Steve. Quota Quickies: The Birth of the British 'B' Film. British Film Institute, 2007.

External links

1903 births
1989 deaths
British male journalists
British male screenwriters
British film directors
People from Tynemouth
20th-century British screenwriters